Gobius ateriformis is a species of marine fish from the family Gobiidae, the true gobies. The species was first described by Alberto Brito and Peter J. Miller in 2001.

Description
This species can reach a length of  TL.

References 

ateriformis
Endemic vertebrates of Cape Verde
Fish of West Africa
Tropical fish
Fish described in 2001
Taxa named by Alberto Brito
Taxa named by Peter J. Miller